Alioune is a masculine given name. Notable people with the surname include:

Alioune Ba (footballer) (born 1989), French footballer
Alioune Bâ (born 1959), Malian photographer
Alioune Badará (born 1989), Senegalese footballer
Alioune Badara Bèye (born 1945), Senegalese civil servant, novelist, playwright, poet and publisher
Alioune Diakhate (born 1994), Senegalese footballer
Alioune Diouf (born 1966), Senegalese wrestler
Alioune Diop (1910–1980), Senegalese writer and editor
Alioune Dramé (c. 1921–1977), Guinean economist and politician
Alioune Fall (born 1994), Senegalese footballer
Alioune Gueye (born, 1987), Senegalese footballer
Alioune Kébé (born 1984), Senegalese footballer
Alioune Mbaye Nder (born 1969), Senegalese singer
Alioune Ndour (born 1997), Senegalese footballer
Alioune Sarr (1908–2001), Senegalese historian, author and politician
Alioune Sene (born 1996), Senegalese-born French pole vaulters
Alioune Sow (born 1936), Senegalese sprinter
Alioune Touré (born  1978), French footballer
Papa Alioune Diouf (born 1989), Senegalese footballer
Papa Alioune Ndiaye (born 1990), Senegalese footballer

See also 
Alioune Diop University of Bambey, University in the Diourbel region of west-central Senegal

Masculine given names